Wholetrain is a 2006 German drama film directed by . It portraits a group of friends spraying Graffitis on trains at night.

Cast 
 Elyas M'Barek - Elyas
  - David
  - Tino
 Jacob Matschenz - Achim
 Alexander Held - Polizist Steinbauer
  - Polizist Gruber
  - Don

References

External links 

2006 drama films
2006 films
German drama films
Grimme-Preis for fiction winners
2000s German-language films
2000s German films